The 2001 Chattanooga Mocs football team represented the University of Tennessee at Chattanooga as a member of the Southern Conference (SoCon) in the 2001 NCAA Division I-AA football season. The Mocs were led by second-year head coach Donnie Kirkpatrick and played their home games at Finley Stadium. They finished the season 3–8 overall and 1–7 in SoConConference play to tie for eighth place.

Schedule

References

Chattanooga
Chattanooga Mocs football seasons
Chattanooga Mocs football